{{DISPLAYTITLE:C20H12N2Na2O7S2}}
The molecular formula C20H12N2Na2O7S2 (molar mass: 502.42 g/mol, exact mass: 501.9881 u) may refer to:

 Acid_Red_13
 Azorubine
 Ponceau 6R